Gabrijel Savić Ra (Габријел Савић, 1978) is a multimedia artist based in Belgrade. He graduated with a philosophy degree from the Philosophical faculty in Belgrade. His main art media is performance art, but he uses also video art, photography, installations, paintings, and different art media crossovers. Ra's performances use body art including bloodletting, walking on broken glass, and other extreme actions. He has exhibited and performed worldwide.

External links
http://www.artmajeur.com/gabrijel
https://web.archive.org/web/20110722043604/http://www.museomadre.it/opere.cfm?id=734
http://www.neme.org/events/in-transition-cyprus-2006
https://web.archive.org/web/20090927125925/http://www.alteredesthetics.com/events/8

Living people
1978 births
Serbian multimedia artists